Para Vista is a suburb in northern Adelaide, South Australia. It is bounded by Wright Road to the South. The northern boundary of the suburb is Montague, Nelson and Milne Roads, making an backwards-L shape of the suburb. The western end is Redhill Road, but the eastern side does not follow streets.

History
Para Vista Post Office opened on 13 January 1964 but was renamed Valley View in October of that year.

References

Suburbs of Adelaide